Serin is a small finch bird from the genus Serinus. Serin may also refer to
Serin (name)
Serín, a district in Spain
Serin, Iran, a village
Serin Chaveh, a village in Iran
Sereyn, a village in Iran
Cea Serin, an American progressive metal band